Alexei Alexandrovich Shakhmatov (– 16 August 1920) was a Russian Imperial philologist and historian credited with laying foundations for the science of textology. Shakhmatov held the title of Doctor of Russian language and philology (since 1894). He was a full member of the Russian Academy of Sciences (before 1917 the Saint Petersburg Academy of Sciences) since 1899 and a chair of the Department of Russian language and philology of the Academy of Sciences (1908–1920), a member of the Constitutional Democratic Party (1905) and the Russian Empire State Council (1906–1911).

Biography
Born in Narva, present-day Estonia, Shakhmatov was brought up by his uncle near Saratov. He went to a public school in Moscow and developed interest for Old Russian language and literature at an early age. At the age of 16, his articles started to appear in the most authoritative journal of Slavic studies of that time, the Archive of Slavic Philology.

Shakhmatov furthered his education at the Imperial Moscow University (1883–1887), later delivering lectures in the same institution. His first monograph, published in 1886, examined the language of ancient Novgorod charters. In 1891 he became so enthusiastic about zemstvo that he gave up his scholarly pursuits for three years and held a minor administrative office in his native village.

In 1894, Shakhmatov returned to Moscow and won great acclaim for his PhD dissertation, entitled Studies in the Sphere of Russian Phonetics. Five years later, he was admitted to the Russian Academy of Sciences, and over the following years became one of the most reputable academicians. He revived the Academy's linguistic periodicals, edited the academic dictionary of Russian language and was elected to represent the Academy at the State Council of Imperial Russia and Imperial State Duma.

In 1909, Shakhmatov moved to work at Saint Petersburg University as a professor. By that time, he had been elected doctor honoris causa by the Charles University, Berlin University, Polish Academy of Sciences, and many other scholarly societies.

1917 Revolution

Shakhmatov participated in the Commission for the Study of the Tribal Composition of the Population of the Borderlands of Russia set up in February 1917. He also helped prepare sweeping reforms of Russian orthography, which would be implemented by the Bolsheviks in 1918, and his orthography is still used to this day. Shakhmatov refused to leave Petrograd for the West, a fatal decision that led to his premature death from malnutrition and exhaustion in 1920. The Academy subsequently cherished his memory and instituted a special Shakhmatov Prize, to be awarded "for the best works in source science, textology and linguistics".

Works
Shakhmatov is an author of several works in phonetics, dialectology, lexicography, syntax, history of East Slavic languages, modern Russian literary language, history of East Slavic people, history of Old Russian literature, Slavic accentology. In his monographies "Research in a field of the Russian phonetics" (Исследования в области русской фонетики, 1894), "To the history of sounds in the Russian language" (К истории звуков русского языка, 1903), and others, Shakhmatov set a goal to restore the All-Russian pronunciation in all of its phonetical details by way of juxtaposition of old and modern eastern Slavic dialects with involving of data from other Slavic languages.

Shakhmatov is best remembered for having pioneered textological research of early Russian chronicles, notably the Primary Chronicle. He established with a great degree of precision the stages of evolution of that key document, even attempting to reconstruct the postulated proto-version of Nestor's chronicle. His research proved seminal for subsequent generations of historians.

Shakhmatov was also responsible for publication and pioneering studies of minor or derelict Slavic languages. His studies of Slavic etymology revolved around the idea of close contacts and influences between the ancient Slavs and Celts, a hypothesis that was subsequently discarded. In particular, Shakhmatov was convinced that Prekmurje Slovene, spoken in Prekmurje and the Slovene March, contains Celtic elements due to its front rounded vowels ü and ö. In fact, Prekmurje Slovene is simply a dialect of Slovene, and the sounds ü and ö are common in other dialects of Slovene, such as in Prlekija and some parts of Carinthia. Hungarian nationalists employed this theory of Shakhmatov against the Slovenes as part of magyarization of the Slovene March.

References 

1864 births
1920 deaths
People from Ivangorod
People from Yamburgsky Uyezd
Russian Constitutional Democratic Party members
Members of the State Council (Russian Empire)
Philologists from the Russian Empire
Linguists from Russia
Full members of the Saint Petersburg Academy of Sciences
Full Members of the Russian Academy of Sciences (1917–1925)